King Yee, formerly called Fu King, is one of the 35 constituencies in the Eastern District. The constituency returns one district councillor to the Eastern District Council, with an election every four years.

King Yee has estimated population of 14,676.

Councillors represented

Election results

2010s

2000s

Notes

References

Siu Sai Wan
Constituencies of Hong Kong
Constituencies of Eastern District Council
2003 establishments in Hong Kong
Constituencies established in 2003